The cinnamon bear (Ursus americanus cinnamomum) is both a highly variable color morph and a subspecies of the American black bear, native to the central, eastern, and western areas of the United States and Canada.

As a subspecies, they therefore most likely exist alongside the mostly black-colored eastern American black bears present in those regions, and breed with them. The most striking difference between a cinnamon bear and any other black bear is its brown or red-brown fur, reminiscent of cinnamon. The subspecies was given this designation because the lighter color phase is more common there than in other areas. It is proposed that the brownish coats actually mimic a grizzly bear.

Description

The various color morphs are frequently intermixed in the same family; hence, seeing either a black-colored female with brown or red-brown cubs, a brown-colored female with black or red-brown cubs, or a female of any one of the three colors with a black cub, a brown cub and a red-brown cub, is a common occurrence.

Behavior
Like other American black bear subspecies, cinnamon bears are omnivorous. Their diet includes fruit, vegetation, nuts, honey, and occasionally insects and meat, varying from other subspecies because of regional habitat differences.

Cinnamon bears are excellent climbers, good runners, and powerful swimmers. They are mostly nocturnal, though they are sometimes active during daylight. 

The bears hibernate during the winter, usually from late October or November to March or April, depending upon the weather conditions. Their scat resembles that of domestic dogs.

Distribution
Established populations are found in Colorado, New Mexico, Utah, Idaho, Nevada, Montana, Washington, Manitoba, Minnesota, Wisconsin, Wyoming, California, Alberta, Ontario, and British Columbia. They are also present in Pennsylvania, Tennessee, Quebec, and New York.

See also
 Kermode bear, another variant of the American black bear
 Confusion between the cinnamon bear and Ungava grizzly

References

American black bears
Carnivorans of North America
Mammals of the United States
Fauna of the Rocky Mountains
Fauna of the Northwestern United States
Fauna of the Northeastern United States
Fauna of the Plains-Midwest_(United States)
Fauna of the Southeastern United States
Mammals of Canada